They Shall Not Perish: The Story of Near East Relief  is a film about Near East Relief (NER)'s efforts to counter the Armenian genocide. Shant Mardirossian, the chairperson emeritus of the organization, produced it, doing so through the company Acorne Productions. The writer and director is George Billard. Victor Garber serves as the narrator. A slogan on a NER fundraising poster was used for the film's name.

The film was first aired in the Scottish Rite Masonic Museum (previously the National Heritage Museum) in Lexington, Massachusetts (Boston metropolitan area) on October 13, 2017. On January 1, 2018 it was released on Netflix.

Cast

 Andrea Martin as Baidzar Bakalian
 Tony Shalhoub as Karnig Parnian
 Ron Rifkin as Henry Morgenthau
 Kathleen Chalfant as Mabel Elliot
 Dariush Kashani as George Mardikian
 Michael Aronov as Leslie A. Davis
 Kara Vedder as Nellie Miller Mann

References

External links
 They Shall Not Perish: The Story of Near East Relief official site
 
 
  - Collaborating with the Genocide Education Project and Near East Foundation

2017 films